Megachile subparallela is a species of bee in the family Megachilidae. It was described by Mitchell in 1944.

References

Subparallela
Insects described in 1944